Plagiodontes is a recent genus of small to medium-sized air-breathing land snails, terrestrial pulmonate gastropods in the family Odontostomidae.  

Plagiodontes is sometimes considered a subgenus in the genus Cyclodontina. It occurs in tropical and sub-tropical regions of South America.

Fossil record
The fossil record of Plagiodontes extends back to the Brazilian Paleocene, with a supposed specimen of Plagiodontes dentatus found in Itaboraí Basin. This same species has also been recorded from the Miocene of Uruguay and Miocene and Pleistocene of Argentina.

Species 
Species within the genus Plagiodontes include:
 Plagiodontes brackebuschii (Doering, 1877)
 Plagiodontes daedaleus (Deshayes, 1851)
Plagiodontes dentatus (Wood, 1828) - fossil from Brazil, Uruguay and Argentina, recent from Argentina - type species of genus
 Plagiodontes multiplicatus (Doering, 1877)
 Plagiodontes parodizi Pizá & Cazzaniga, 2016
 Plagiodontes patagonicus (d'Orbigny, 1835)
 Plagiodontes rocae Doering, 1881
 Plagiodontes strobelii (Doering, 1877)
 Plagiodontes weyenberghii (Doering, 1877)
 Plagiodontes weyrauchi Pizá & Cazzaniga, 2009
Synonyms
 Plagiodontes dentata (Wood, 1828): synonym of Plagiodontes dentatus (W. Wood, 1828) (incorrect gender of species epithet)
 Plagiodontes iheringi (Pilsbry & Vanatta, 1898): synonym of Plagiodontes patagonicus (d'Orbigny, 1835)
 Plagiodontes patagonica (d'Orbigny, 1835): synonym of Plagiodontes patagonicus (d'Orbigny, 1835) (incorrect gender of species epithet)
Plagiodontes trahyrae - from Brazil: synonym of Cyclodontina trahyrae (S. H. F. Jaeckel, 1950)

References 

 Bank, R. A. (2017). Classification of the Recent terrestrial Gastropoda of the World. Last update: July 16th, 2017

External links
 Doering, A. (1877). Apuntes sobre la fauna de moluscos de la República Argentina. Tercera parte. Boletín de la Academia Nacional de Ciencias Exactas, Córdoba. 2(3) ["1876": 300-340]

Odontostomidae